Magic bullet theory may refer to:

 Single-bullet theory, a theory relating to the assassination of John F Kennedy
 Hypodermic needle model, a theory of a direct effect of the mass media on audiences